Leaf Rapids Water Aerodrome  is a registered aerodrome located  north of Leaf Rapids, Manitoba, Canada.

See also
Leaf Rapids Airport

References

Registered aerodromes in Manitoba
Seaplane bases in Manitoba